Nobody but Me may refer to:
 Nobody but Me (Human Beinz album), 1968
 Nobody but Me (Michael Bublé album), 2016
 "Nobody but Me" (Michael Bublé song), 2016
 "Nobody but Me" (Blake Shelton song), 2005
 "Nobody but Me" (The Isley Brothers song), covered by The Human Beinz among others
 "Nobody but Me", a song written by Doc Pomus and Mort Shuman and recorded by The Drifters, the B-side of the single "Save the Last Dance for Me"
 "Nobody but Me", a song by Save Ferris from the album It Means Everything
 "Nobody but Me", a song by Laurel Aitken
 "Nobody but Me", a song written by Billy Myles, recorded by Lou Rawls

See also

"Everybody Loves My Baby", a 1924 song one might wrongly think is entitled "Nobody but Me"
Nobody but You (disambiguation)